God Sleeps in Rwanda is a 2005 documentary short subject about five women who were affected by the 1994 Genocide against the Tutsi   in Rwanda.  After the 1994 Genocide against Tutsi in Rwanda, most women both young, adults, and old were exceeding the number of men about 70% in which Ten of thousands of these women were raped and left at the battle to fight against the spread of HIV/AIDS, and therefore, this departed all women from the Rwandan society because their rights were not respected. Thus this documentary about God Sleeps in Rwanda has come to give us more insights about five Rwandan females who stood up for being the voice of other women.

This documentary uncovers more inspirations of hope of all Rwandans after the 1994 Genocide against Tutsi in Rwanda which introduced to us five inspiring females who reconstructed themselves, reorganized their contributions to the society of Rwanda, and thus brought hope to all and amended wounds of those who were wounded. This story in the documentary, the filmmaker in God Sleeps in Rwanda reveals an incredible story of a woman with positive HIV who was a policewoman trying her best to raise four children on her behalf and attempted to attend night classes to become an advocate for people/lawyer. She now becomes the first head of the household living with four siblings, and thereafter, she becomes one of the responsible officials known in her neighborhood. Thus this film documentary gives us an important insights of the effects of the tragedy that happened in Rwanda and give us spirit and courage to develop our nation.

Award Winning 
On January 31, 2006 it was nominated for the Academy Award for Best Documentary Short Subject. It lost to A Note of Triumph: The Golden Age of Norman Corwin.

Emmy Winner for Best Documentary and Academy Award Nominee for Best Documentary Short

It was broadcast on the Cinemax documentary series Cinemax Reel Life and won a News and Documentary Emmy Award for Best Documentary in 2007.

References

External links
 Official site
 
 God Sleeps in Rwanda at Women Make Movies

2005 films
English-language Rwandan films
American short documentary films
Rwandan short documentary films
American independent films
Documentary films about the Rwandan genocide
Documentary films about women in Africa
2005 short documentary films
2005 independent films
2000s English-language films
2000s American films